2021 Astana Open – Doubles may refer to:

 2021 Astana Open – Men's Doubles
 2021 Astana Open – Women's Doubles